Argebad or Argebaud was the Visigothic Archbishop of Narbonne (fl. c. 672). He played a major role in the Septimanian rebellion in 672 A.D. 

Argebad was a strong supporter of King Recceswinth, and remained a supporter of his successor.
When the dux Paul was sent to Narbonensis to quell a revolt of Hilderic of Nîmes in 672, he conspired with the rebels and with his own supporters to stage a revolt and have himself crowned king in opposition to the legitimate monarch, Wamba. Having been apprised of Paul's intentions, Argebad sent word of it to Wamba, but before he himself could prepare the defences of Narbonne to prevent Paul's entering, the rebel and usurper marched on the city and took it.

Argebad appears to have come to terms with the insurrectionists, however, for he was at Nîmes with them in late summer. On 2 September 672, Paul, with the counsel of his leading followers, sent word with Argebad to Wamba, who was within four miles of Nîmes. Argebad asked that the rebels be spared their lives and, further, that they be spared any penalty for their disloyalty. Wamba agreed to the first request, but denied the second.

References

Sources
Thompson, E. A. The Goths in Spain. Oxford: Clarendon Press, 1969.

Archbishops of Narbonne
7th-century people of the Visigothic Kingdom
7th-century archbishops